A nominal category or a nominal group is a group of objects or ideas that can be collectively grouped on the basis of a particular characteristic—a qualitative property. A variable that codes whether each one in a set of observations is in a particular nominal category is called a categorical variable.

Valid data operations
A nominal group only has members and non-members. That is, nothing more can be said about the members of the group other than they are part of the group. Nominal categories cannot be numerically organized or ranked. The members of a nominal group cannot be placed in  ordinal (sequential) or ratio form.

Nominal categories of data are often compared to ordinal and ratio data, to see if nominal categories play a role in determining these other factors. For example, the effect of race (nominal) on income (ratio) could be investigated by regressing the level of income upon one or more dummy variables that specify race. When nominal variables are to be explained, logistic regression or probit regression is commonly used.

Examples
For example, citizenship is a nominal group. A person can either be a citizen of a country or not. One citizen of Canada does not have "more citizenship" than another citizen of Canada; therefore it is impossible to order citizenship according to any sort of mathematical logic.

Another example would be "words that start with the letter 'a'". There are thousands of words that start with the letter 'a' but none have "more" of this nominal quality than others.

Correlating two nominal categories is thus very difficult, because some relationships that occur are actually spurious, and thus unimportant. For example, trying to figure out whether proportionally more Canadians have first names starting with the letter 'a' than non-Canadians would be a fairly arbitrary, random exercise.

See also
Level of measurement

References

Statistical data types
Categorical data